The 41st Los Angeles Film Critics Association Awards, given by the Los Angeles Film Critics Association (LAFCA), honored the best in film for 2015.

Winners

Best Picture:
Spotlight
Runner-up: Mad Max: Fury Road
Best Director:
George Miller – Mad Max: Fury Road
Runner-up: Todd Haynes – Carol
Best Actor:
Michael Fassbender – Steve Jobs
Runner-up: Géza Röhrig – Son of Saul
Best Actress:
Charlotte Rampling – 45 YearsRunner-up: Saoirse Ronan – BrooklynBest Supporting Actor:
Michael Shannon – 99 HomesRunner-up: Mark Rylance – Bridge of SpiesBest Supporting Actress:Alicia Vikander – Ex MachinaRunner-up: Kristen Stewart – Clouds of Sils MariaBest Screenplay:Josh Singer and Tom McCarthy – SpotlightRunner-up: Charlie Kaufman – AnomalisaBest Cinematography:John Seale – Mad Max: Fury RoadRunner-up: Edward Lachman – CarolBest Editing:Hank Corwin – The Big ShortRunner-up: Margaret Sixel – Mad Max: Fury RoadBest Production Design:Colin Gibson – Mad Max: Fury RoadRunner-up: Judy Becker – CarolBest Music Score:Carter Burwell – Anomalisa and CarolRunner-up: Ennio Morricone – The Hateful EightBest Foreign Language Film:Son of Saul • HungaryRunner-up: The Tribe • UkraineBest Documentary/Non-Fiction Film:AmyRunner-up: The Look of SilenceBest Animation:AnomalisaRunner-up: Inside OutNew Generation Award:Ryan Coogler – CreedCareer Achievement Award:Anne V. CoatesSpecial Citation:'''
David Shepard

References

External links
 41st Annual Los Angeles Film Critics Association Awards

2015
Los Angeles Film Critics Association Awards
Los Angeles Film Critics Association Awards
Los Angeles Film Critics Association Awards
Los Angeles Film Critics Association Awards